Cobber is an Australian and New Zealand word for "mate" or "friend".

Cobber or Cobbers may also refer to:

 Edgar Kain (1918-1940), New Zealand Second World War flying ace nicknamed "Cobber"
 the athletics teams of Concordia College (Moorhead, Minnesota)
 River Cobber, Cornwall, England - see Coverack Bridges
 Cobbers, a sculpture in the Australian Memorial Park by Peter Corlett
 , a Second World War trawler - see List of requisitioned trawlers of the Royal Navy (WWII)